Col. Richard P. Taylor House is a historic plantation complex and national historic district located near Huntsboro, Granville County, North Carolina.  The plantation house was built about 1835, and is a tall two-story, five bay, transitional Federal / Greek Revival style frame dwelling.  It has a one-story rear ell, exterior end chimneys, and a full-height brick basement.  The house is nearly identical to that built by Col. Richard Taylor's half-brother, the Archibald Taylor Plantation House.  Also on the property are the contributing early mortise and tenon smokehouse, a pigeon house or tobacco packhouse, an air-cure tobacco barn, a frame corn crib, and two log tobacco barns.

It was listed on the National Register of Historic Places in 1988.

References

Plantation houses in North Carolina
Houses on the National Register of Historic Places in North Carolina
Historic districts on the National Register of Historic Places in North Carolina
Greek Revival houses in North Carolina
Federal architecture in North Carolina
Houses completed in 1835
Houses in Granville County, North Carolina
National Register of Historic Places in Granville County, North Carolina